Onneley is a hamlet in the Borough of Newcastle-under-Lyme, Staffordshire.

Situated within Onneley is the local Golf and Cricket club.

Onneley Cricket club play at the Onneley Oval.

See also
Listed buildings in Madeley, Staffordshire

References

External links

Onneley is mentioned in Puff, the Magic Dragon as "Honahlee".

Hamlets in Staffordshire
Borough of Newcastle-under-Lyme